Asmavia Iqbal Khokhar (born 1 January 1988) is a Pakistani former cricketer who played primarily as a right-arm medium fast bowler. She appeared in 92 One Day Internationals and 68 Twenty20 Internationals for Pakistan between 2005 and 2017. She was the first cricketer to take a hat-trick in a WT20I, taken against England in 2012. She played domestic cricket for Multan, Zarai Taraqiati Bank Limited, Omar Associates, Saif Sports Saga and State Bank of Pakistan.

Career
Iqbal made her One Day International debut against Sri Lanka at the National Stadium in Karachi on 28 December 2005.

She was part of the team at the ICC Women's Cricket World Cup in 2009 and 2017. Iqbal was selected to play in the 2010 Asian Games in China.

References

External links
 
 

1988 births
Living people
Punjabi people
Cricketers from Multan
Pakistani women cricketers
Pakistan women One Day International cricketers
Pakistan women Twenty20 International cricketers
Women's Twenty20 International cricket hat-trick takers
Multan women cricketers
Zarai Taraqiati Bank Limited women cricketers
Omar Associates women cricketers
Saif Sports Saga women cricketers
State Bank of Pakistan women cricketers
Asian Games gold medalists for Pakistan
Asian Games medalists in cricket
Cricketers at the 2010 Asian Games
Cricketers at the 2014 Asian Games
Medalists at the 2010 Asian Games
Medalists at the 2014 Asian Games